Jabaquara is a station on Line 1 (Blue) of the São Paulo Metro and is the current terminus. It will be integrated with the planned Line 17 (Gold).

The station integrates with the Jabaquara Intermunicipal Terminal, allowing passengers to transfer to SPTrans and EMTU bus lines with their Bilhete Único card.

SPTrans lines 
The following SPTrans bus lines can be accessed. Passengers may use a Bilhete Único card for transfer:

References 

São Paulo Metro stations
Railway stations opened in 1974
1974 establishments in Brazil
Railway stations located underground in Brazil